Lake Johanna may refer to:

Lake Johanna (Ramsey County, Minnesota)
Lake Johanna Township, Pope County, Minnesota